Patricia Dal (born in Buenos Aires) is an Argentine actress and dancer. Dal started her career as a scantily clad model and soon she was in “Las Vegas” style shows as a dancer.  After achieving fame as a vedette the Argentine cinema industry noticed of her vocation as a comedian actress. She was part of the principal cast of several movies and television humorist shows.

Patricia Dal cinematography

References

External links 
 

Living people
People from Buenos Aires
Argentine film actresses
Argentine television personalities
Women television personalities
Argentine female dancers
Year of birth missing (living people)